James Althoff (born September 27, 1961) is a former American football defensive tackle who played for the Chicago Bears of the National Football League (NFL). He played college football at Winona State University.

References 

1961 births
Living people
Players of American football from Illinois
American football defensive tackles
Winona State Warriors football players
Chicago Bears players